Wrong Creatures is the eighth studio album by American rock band Black Rebel Motorcycle Club. The album was released through Vagrant Records on January 12, 2018.

Four songs were released as singles in late 2017 ahead of the album's release: "Little Thing Gone Wild", "Haunt", "Question of Faith", and "King of Bones". A limited edition package with a clear vinyl edition of the album, a black BRMC-branded Hohner harmonica, and a 'Black Cassette EP' was released in late April 2018. The EP contained three new unreleased songs and an extended version of the album's opener, "DFF".

Reception

Wrong Creatures received generally favorable reviews from music critics. On review aggregator website Metacritic, which uses a weighted average, the album was assigned a score of 71/100 based on 18 reviews.

Track listing
Track listing and lengths confirmed by iTunes.

Charts

References

2018 albums
Vagrant Records albums
Black Rebel Motorcycle Club albums